A by-election was held in the Cook Islands electorate of Pukapuka-Nassau on 7 June 2011.  The by-election was precipitated by an electoral petition declaring the election of Tekii Lazaro in the 2010 election invalid.

The election was contested by two candidates, and won by the Cook Islands Party's Tekii Lazaro.

References

By-elections in the Cook Islands
2011 elections in Oceania
2011 in the Cook Islands